Etienne Briand (born 22 February 1993) is a Canadian judoka.

He is the bronze medallist of the 2019 Judo Grand Slam Ekaterinburg in the -81 kg category.

References

External links
 

1993 births
Living people
Canadian male judoka
20th-century Canadian people
21st-century Canadian people